Peter Speeth (29 November 1772 – 1831) was a German architect.

Speeth was born in Mannheim and worked in Frankfurt from 1788–1794 under Nicolas de Pigage (1723-1796), in Heidelberg from 1797, and from 1804 at Amorbach for the Prince of Leiningen. In 1807 he moved to Würzburg in the service of Ferdinand III, Grand Duke of Tuscany, where he designed the Women's Pententiary (1809–1810), an early and striking Neo-Renaissance design, as well as the Zeller Torhaus guard house (1814) which resembles Claude-Nicolas Ledoux's barrières for Paris, and the Gerichtsdienerhaus (House of the Court Usher, 1811–13). His employment for the Grand Duke ended in 1815, and in 1826 he moved to Russia. He died in Odessa in 1831.

Selected works 
 Frauenzuchthaus (Former Women's Penitentiary) - Burkaderstraße 44, Würzburg, 1809–1810 
 Gerichtsdienerhaus (House of the Court Usher) - 9 Turmgasse, Würzburg (1811–13, much altered) 
 Direktorwohnhaus der Musikschule - Paradeplatz 1, Würzburg, 1812-1815 
 Zeller Torhaus (guard house) -, 45 Zeller Strasse, 1814 
 Wohnhaus des Landrichters Wirth - Sanderstraße 31, Würzburg, 1821 
 Church of St. John the Baptist - Unterhohenried, near Hassfurt, 1812–1817
 Metropolitan Church - Kishinev, Russia (begun 1826)

References 
 Answers.com entry
 
 Russische Orthodoxe Kirche description (German)
 Henry-Russell Hitchcock, Architecture, page 45.

18th-century German architects
1831 deaths
1772 births
19th-century German architects
Architects from Mannheim